Divertimento No. 15 may refer to:
 Divertimento No. 15 (Mozart), a composition by Wolfgang Amadeus Mozart
 Divertimento No. 15 (ballet), a ballet by George Balanchine